Japanese art is collected by museums, galleries and private collectors in many countries around the world.

See also 
 List of museums of Asian art
 List of museums

References 

Collections
Japanese art